The 2011 FAI Senior Challenge Cup, also known as the 2011 FAI Ford Cup, is the 91st season of the national football competition of the Republic of Ireland. The winners of the competition will earn spots in both the second qualifying round of the 2012–13 UEFA Europa League and the 2012 Setanta Sports Cup.

A total of 45 teams competed in the 2011 competition which commenced on the weekend ending on 20 March 2011. The 21 teams entered from the 2011 League of Ireland Premier and First divisions received byes into the third round stage while the remaining 24 teams entered at the first and Second round stages with all but four of these teams receiving byes into the second round. These 24 teams composed of four 2011 A Championship non-reserve clubs, the sixteen clubs from the fourth round of the 2010–11 FAI Intermediate Cup and the semifinalists of the 2010–11 FAI Junior Cup.

Teams

Calendar
The calendar for the 2011 FAI Cup, as announced by Football Association of Ireland.

Preliminary rounds

First round 
The draw for this round was conducted by FAI President Paddy McCaul and former player Paul Whelan at the FAI headquarters in Abbotstown on 7 March 2011. Only four of the 24 non-League of Ireland clubs participated in this round, with the remaining 20 clubs earning a bye to the second round. The matches were played on the weekend ending 20 March 2011.

Second round 
Like for the first round, the draw for this round was conducted by FAI President Paddy McCaul and former player Paul Whelan at the FAI headquarters in Abbotstown on 7 March 2011. The two winners from the first round joined the remaining 20 non-League of Ireland clubs in this round. The matches were played on the weekend ending 17 April 2011.

Third round 
In this round, the 21 clubs of the 2011 League of Ireland will be joined by the 11 winners of the second round. The draw for the third round was made on 9 May 2011 on Monday Night Soccer on RTÉ Two.
The Third round games will be played on the weekend ending 5 June 2011.

Fourth round
The draw for the fourth round was made on 13 July 2011 on Monday Night Soccer.

Note 1: After a 3–2 victory for Sheriff Y.C. they were subsequently found to have fielded an ineligible player and were ejected from the cup. Shelbourne were awarded a 3–0 victory and qualified for the Quarter-finals.

Final rounds

Quarter-finals
The draw for the Quarter-finals, conducted by Vice President of FAI, Tony Fitzgerald and Women's Irish national football team manager Susan Ronan, took place on 29 August 2011 on Monday Night Soccer. Fixtures took place on the weekend of 18 September 2011.

Semifinals
The draw for the semi-finals was conducted by Paul Osam and FAI President Paddy McCaul during Monday Night Soccer on 26 September 2011, after the first 3 games, but before the Shelbourne v Limerick game. Ties will be played on the weekend of 14 and 16 October 2011.

Final

External links 
 Official competition website

References 

 
2011
2